Patrick Gleason is a comic book artist and writer.  He has worked for DC Comics, Marvel Comics, and Image Comics.

Published work 

X-Men Unlimited #22 (with Brian K Vaughan, Marvel Comics, 1999)
Martian Manhunter Vol. 2 #24 (inker, with Tom Mandrake, Doug Mahnke, DC Comics, 2000)
Noble Causes #1-4 (with Jay Faerber, Image Comics, 2002)
JSA #39 (with Geoff Johns, David S. Goyer, DC Comics, 2002)
JLA: Welcome to the Working Week One-Shot (with Patton Oswalt, DC Comics, 2003)
H-E-R-O #7-8 (with Will Pfeifer, DC Comics, 2003)
Aquaman Vol. 6 #15-22, 25-29, 32 (with Will Pfeifer and  John Arcudi, DC Comics, 2004-05)
Green Lantern Corps: Recharge #1-5 (with Geoff Johns and Dave Gibbons, DC Comics, 2005-06)
Green Lantern Corps #1-3, 7-16, 18-20, 23-26, 29-47 (with Dave Gibbons, Keith Champagne, and Peter Tomasi, DC Comics, 2006-10)
Brightest Day #1-3, 6-9, 11-12, 15, 21, 24 (with Geoff Johns and Peter Tomasi, DC Comics, 2010-11)
Batman and Robin #20-22 (with Peter Tomasi, DC Comics, 2011)
Batman and Robin Vol. 2 #0-8, 10-20, 22-30, 32-40 (with Peter Tomasi, DC Comics, 2011-15)
Robin: Son of Batman 1-6, 9 (writer/artist), #7 (writer only, DC Comics, 2015-16)
Superman: Rebirth #1 (writer, with Peter Tomasi and Doug Mahnke, DC Comics, 2016)
Superman Vol. 4 #1-25, 27-28, 33-39, 42-45, Annual #1, Special #1 (writer, with Peter Tomasi; also artist on #1-2, 4, 6, 10-11, 18-21, 24-25, 42-43, 45, DC Comics, 2016-18)
Super Sons #11-12 (writer, with Peter Tomasi, Ryan Benjamin, and Tyler Kirkham, DC Comics 2017)
Teen Titans vol. 6 #15 (writer, with Peter Tomasi and Ed Benes, DC Comics 2017)
Action Comics #1000-1002 (with Peter Tomasi and Brian Bendis, DC Comics, 2018)
Young Justice 1-4 (with Brian Bendis, DC Comics, 2019)
Amazing Spider-Man Vol. 5 #25, 32-34, 50-52, 55, 61-62, 74-76, 83, 89-90, 93 (writer, with Nick Spencer, Zeb Wells, Marvel Comics, 2019-2022)
Batman: Secret Files #2 (with Tim Seeley, DC Comics, 2019)
Marvel Comics #1000 (single page story, writer/artist, Marvel Comics, 2019)

References

External links
Patrick Gleason at ComicBookDB.com
Patrick Gleason at The Grand Comics Database
The Straight Poop 

American comics artists
Living people
Year of birth missing (living people)